Villeneuve-de-Duras is a commune in the Lot-et-Garonne department in the southwestern portion of France.

See also
Communes of the Lot-et-Garonne department

References

Villeneuvededuras